The 1120s BC is a decade which lasted from 1129 BC to 1120 BC.

Events and trends
 1126 BC—Thymoetes, legendary King of Athens, dies childless after a reign of 8 years. He is succeeded by his designated heir Melanthus of Pylos, a fifth-generation descendant of Neleus who had reportedly assisted him in battle against the Boeotians.
 1122 BC—Legendary founding emigration of Gija to Gija Joseon.
 1122 BC—The Zhou Dynasty was founded.
 c. 1120 BC—Destruction of Troy.

Significant people